The 2014 season is Seinäjoen Jalkapallokerho's 7th competitive season, and first season in the Veikkausliiga.

Squad

On loan

Transfers

Winter

In:

Out:

Summer

In:

Out:

Competitions

Veikkausliiga

The 2014 Veikkausliiga season began on April 12, 2015 and ended on October 25th 2015. Veikkausliiga takes place in the spring to autumn season, due to harsh winter weather conditions in Finland.

League table

Results summary

Results by matchday

Results

Finnish Cup

League Cup

Group stage

Knockout stages

Squad statistics

Appearances and goals

|-
|colspan="14"|Players away from SJK on loan:

|-
|colspan="14"|Players who left SJK during the season:

|}

Goal scorers

Clean sheets

Disciplinary record

Notes

References

Sjk
Seinäjoen Jalkapallokerho seasons